Lillooet is a district municipality in the Squamish-Lillooet region of southwestern British Columbia. The town is on the west shore of the Fraser River immediately north of the Seton River mouth.

First Nations
A main population centre of the Stʼatʼimc (Lillooet Nation), who comprise just over 50 per cent of the Lillooet area residents, it is one of the southernmost communities in North America where indigenous people form the majority. First Nations communities assert the land is traditional territory, having been continuously inhabited for thousands of years. The confluence of several main streams with the Fraser attracted large seasonal and permanent indigenous populations. Situated in the Lower Fountain, the Bridge River Rapids (Sat' or Setl), which blocked migrating salmon, has remained a popular fishing and fish drying site for centuries. Keatley Creek Archaeological Site, one of the largest ancient pit-house communities in the Pacific Northwest, is one of the many archaeological and heritage sites in the vicinity. Several petroglyph sites have been documented along the Fraser in the vicinity of Lillooet.

Name origin
The First Nations name of Pap-shil-KWA-KA-meen translates as the "place where the three rivers meet". The former European name of Cayoosh Flat inferred a dead or dying Cayuse horse (namely a decrepit specimen) at the river. In 1859, Governor Douglas granted a petition to change the name to Lillooet. The Lil'wat people lived on the Douglas Road, a.k.a. the Lakes Route, which was the main trail from the south. This name, which means "wild onion", appears on Anderson's 1849 map.

Roads, ferries and bridges
For the fortune seekers of the Fraser Canyon Gold Rush (upper canyon) and the Cariboo Gold Rush, the portage-intensive Douglas Road from the south terminated at Lillooet. 
Across the Fraser, Parsonville was "Mile 0" of the Old Cariboo Road, which stretched about  northward to Alexandria. Built as a toll road by Gustavus Blin Wright, the first 20 to 30 kilometres of tortuous canyon-brink grade remained little changed until the 1970s. In 1864, the shorter Cariboo Road, which connected Yale to Barkerville via Ashcroft, bypassed Lillooet.

The Fraser was crossed by ferry at Lillooet. Parsonville had faded into obscurity by 1889, when the first bridge at Lillooet opened. Consequently, Lillooet became "Mile 0". The numbered roadhouse names of the Cariboo district became measured from the bend in Main Street commemorated by a cairn erected in 1939. However, when the present bridge was constructed south of the town, these old travel measurements became understated by about two miles.

In 1994, fire destroyed the station bridge over the Seton River. In 2020, a two-lane structure replaced the temporary single lane bridge installed in 1994.

Mining 
The section of Main Street north from the cairn was called "the Golden Mile" allegedly to reflect gold dust scattered on the ground but indisputably as a supply hub fueled by the goldrush traffic.

West of Lillooet, the Golden Cache Mine on Cayoosh Creek, was staked in 1895. However, promising expectations proved illusive, which ended further investment. The associated prospecting boom ceased by 1900, when mining activity relocated to the Klondike.

Other gold prospecting in the area included underground hard-rock mining in the Bridge River Country, which began in the 1880s and 1890s, but peaked from the 1930s to the 1950s. Gold Bridge and Bralorne were mining centres. Prospecting for gold continues and to a lesser extent for copper, silver and nephrite jade. Until the discovery of larger jade deposits near Cassiar, the Lillooet area was the world's largest source of the nephrite form. Unknown tonnes were exported to China before government assayers discovered the nature of the "black rocks" that the Chinese miners found so interesting.

In the 1950s, local farmer and teacher Ron Purvis adapted the skil-saw concept to create a diamond rotary blade. The blade could safely cut the immovable jade boulders which line the banks and beds of the Fraser and Bridge rivers, whereas blasting would have shattered the rock. Although local stores sell polished jade souvenirs, major commercial jade operations no longer exist in the Lillooet area.

Railway

The northward advance of the Pacific Great Eastern Railway (PGE) rail head reached the head of
Seton Lake in January 1915 and the Lillooet locality the following month. PGE built a depot between the Seton River and Cayoosh Creek. That month, the first passenger train arrived, triggering a revival for the isolated town, since a railway could ship agricultural produce. By year end, the track reached Clinton, an additional .

To benefit the railway rather than land speculators, PGE had bypassed the downtown by crossing the Fraser south of the Seton River on the Lillooet railway bridge. PGE erected a station and four-stall roundhouse at East Lillooet, which was a divisional point. The initial depot, called Lillooet station, was  westward across the Fraser.

In 1930, PGE built the  Lillooet Diversion from the head of Seton Lake, through the downtown, and north to the Polley bridge. In 1931, PGE completed the bridge, built a new two-storey station downtown, and dismantled and reassembled the roundhouse nearby. The latter was demolished during the early 1970s.

The withdrawal of the Cariboo Prospector passenger train in October 2002 ended through service. Canadian National Railway freight trains on break and the Kaoham Shuttle still use the station.

Early community
The town began as a goldrush centre in the late 1850s, booming during the progression of discoveries on the Fraser and in the Cariboo in the early 1860s. The title of "the largest town west of Chicago and north of San Francisco" moved in rapid succession from Yale to Lillooet, and then to Barkerville. Just after this gold rush, the town's layout was surveyed by the Royal Engineers.

In 1860, the population was 4,000–5,000. About that time, Richard Hoey was granted  on the Texas Creek Road. St. Mary the Virgin Anglican church was built in 1861 and a school established in 1863. That year, the hotels and shops served a population of about 1,600. The Stage Hotel (1860) was considered first class. The Pioneer Hotel (1862) became the Excelsior in the early 1900s. Further lodgings were the International Hotel (1866) and Victoria Hotel (1892).

In 1864, Joseph Watkinson, Thomas Harris, F.W. Foster, and Richard Hoey built the first flour mill. In 1896, St. Andrews Presbyterian church was erected. In 1904, the town was surveyed.

The 1930 fire destroyed the Excelsior, Hurley's Grocery, a movie theatre and the government liquor store. In 1946, the settlement incorporated as a village municipality. In 1948, fire destroyed the Log Cabin Theatre, an 1860s livery barn that had been remodelled into theatre in 1934.

Booms occurred during local gold mining activity, and in the 1940s and 50s during the construction of the Bridge River Power Project. In 1996, the town re-incorporated as a district municipality.

Forestry and agriculture

The economy was historically based upon logging, the railway, ranching, farming, and government services. The long growing season has favoured orchards, and in recent times, ginseng. Once, hop and tobacco crops supported the former local beer, cigar and chewing tobacco industries. The town has relied upon forestry since the mid-1970s.

In the 1940s, an Italian named Savona planted vines in the Fountain area. Established in 2009, the Fort Berens Winery in East Lillooet was the first attempt at commercial viticulture. Visitors can taste the award-winning wines.

Japanese internment camps
Four internment camps existed in the Lillooet area during World War II, following the removal of Japanese Canadians from the British Columbia Coast in 1942. Each were "self-support" sites, where family groups who had the financial means could remain together, but the locations were more isolated than the camps in the Kootenays. Since internees were not permitted to return to the coast until 1949, many families permanently settled in Lillooet. The largest camp was East Lillooet, housing 309 people. The other nearby camps were at Shalalth, Minto Mine, and McGillvray Falls.

Later community

The town includes infrastructure typical for its size.

In 2009, the district developed a community plan. In 2013, the water treatment plant received a $5.6 million upgrade. In 2019, Tourism Lillooet released a strategic plan. In 2022, an electric vehicle fast charging station opened.

Police, fire, and ambulance, respectively operate emergency service bases. The Lillooet Hospital & Health Centre is a Level 1 Community Hospital which includes 24-hour emergency services. The district owns and operates the Lillooet Airport.

Demographics

Lillooet's larger regional population includes that of the three large bands of the St'at'imc or Lillooet Nation whose reserves abut the town on all sides, and another three large reserves within ; 430 of the District of Lillooet's population are aboriginal. Historical populations have included large numbers of Americans and Chinese, although there are few of either today (although many longtime local families, First Nations and non-First Nations, have some bloodlines from both). The town's non-native population has been historically multi-ethnic in extraction, with a relatively high-rate of intermarriage between all groups.

Religion 
According to the 2021 census, religious groups in Lillooet included:
Irreligion (1,490 persons or 65.5%)
Christianity (735 persons or 32.3%)
Other (25 persons or 1.1%)

Education
Lillooet has one high school, Lillooet Secondary, which also serves students from neighbouring rural localities such as Shalalth, Seton Portage, Gold Bridge and Bralorne, although those communities do offer students a secondary school program. Cayoosh Elementary School is in the Cayoosh Heights subdivision and George M. Murray Elementary serves North Lillooet. The Upper St'at'imc Culture, Language and Education Society (USCLES) operates education programs, but most St'at'imc children attend the public school system. Post-secondary programs are offered at a Thompson Rivers University campus.

Notable people
Johnder Basran, first Indo-Canadian mayor in Canada
Alexander E.B. Davie, member of the Legislative Assembly for Lillooet and 8th Premier of British Columbia
Don Dickinson, Canadian writer and teacher. He was shortlisted nominee for the Governor General's Award for English-language fiction at the 1991 Governor General's Awards for his short story collection Blue Husbands, and for the 1993 Books in Canada First Novel Award for his novel The Crew. Blue Husbands was also a winner of the Ethel Wilson Fiction Prize in 1992.
A.C. Elliott, magistrate in Lillooet and 4th Premier of British Columbia
George Leach, actor and Juno award-winning songwriter/guitarist
Bertha Hosang Mah, first Chinese woman to graduate from a Canadian university (McGill, 1917); born in Lillooet
Masajiro Miyazaki, Japanese-Canadian internee and town coroner during WWII, founder of the local ambulance and hospital, Order of Canada awardee
George Murray, MLA and publisher of the 'Bridge River-Lillooet News'
Margaret Lally "Ma" Murray, editor of the Bridge River-Lillooet News, Order of Canada awardee
Caspar Phair, Lillooet pioneer, Gold Commissioner and first Government Agent

Climate
Lillooet experiences a semi-arid climate (Köppen BSk).

The locality often vies with Lytton and Osoyoos for the title of "Canada's Hot Spot" on a daily basis in summer.

Lillooet holds the record for the fourth-hottest temperature recorded in British Columbia and Canada (behind Lytton, Ashcroft and Kamloops). On 29 June 2021, during the 2021 Western North America heat wave which brought unprecedented heat to the Pacific Northwest, the temperature reached . Lillooet also holds the record for the hottest temperature recorded in the province during the months of April, May, and December. The coldest temperature recorded was measured at the airport during a November cold snap in 1985.

Footnotes

References

External links 

Lillooet
British Columbia gold rushes
Canadian gold rushes
District municipalities in British Columbia
Internment of Japanese Canadians
Populated places on the Fraser River
World War II internment camps in Canada